The Italy national speedway team are motorcycle speedway national team from Italy. The best achievement of team is 7th place in Speedway World Cup in 2004.

2013 Team 
 Michele Paco Castagna
 Nicolas Vicentin
 Guglielmo Franchetti
 Nicolas Covatti

Speedway World Cup

Riders

European Pairs Speedway Championship

References 
 Świat Żużla, No 3 (75) /2008, pages 25, .

See also 
 motorcycle speedway

National speedway teams
Speedway
Speedway
National speedway team